Zhang Weigang (born 16 July 1961) is a Chinese sport shooter who competed in the 1988 Summer Olympics.

His height and weight are 176 cm and 73 kg, respectively.

References

External links 

 en.sjtu.edu.cn
 Olympedia.org

1961 births
Living people
Chinese male sport shooters
Skeet shooters
Olympic shooters of China
Shooters at the 1988 Summer Olympics
Shooters at the 1986 Asian Games
Shooters at the 1990 Asian Games
Shooters at the 1994 Asian Games
Asian Games medalists in shooting
Asian Games gold medalists for China
Asian Games silver medalists for China
Asian Games bronze medalists for China
Medalists at the 1986 Asian Games
Medalists at the 1990 Asian Games
Medalists at the 1994 Asian Games
20th-century Chinese people